Ditula is a genus of moths belonging to the family Tortricidae.

Species
Ditula angustiorana (Haworth, [1811])
Ditula saturana (Turati, 1913)

See also
List of Tortricidae genera

References

External links
tortricidae.com

Archipini
Tortricidae genera
Taxa named by James Francis Stephens